Perlenbach may refer to:

Perlenbach (Rur), a river of North Rhine-Westphalia, Germany, tributary of the Rur
Perlenbach Valley, the valley of the Perlenbach
Perlenbach-Fuhrtsbachtal, a nature reserve
Perlenbach (Schwesnitz), a river of Bavaria, Germany, headstream of the Schwesnitz